Tech CU Arena is a multi-purpose arena in San Jose, California. It is the home of the San Jose Barracuda of the American Hockey League (AHL).

Construction

In January 2020, the San Jose City Council voted unanimously to approve the 200,000 square-foot expansion of Sharks Ice San Jose, adding two additional recreational ice sheets to the facility, increasing the building's total ice sheets to six and doubling the facility's footprint to just under 400,000 square feet. The expansion will make Sharks Ice at San Jose the largest ice facility in the United States, and will include a focus on green building initiatives including high efficiency LED lighting, electric Zamboni, and electric vehicle chargers.  On March 15, 2022, Technology Credit Union took over the naming rights in a deal that would last until at least 2032.

The arena opened on August 24, 2022, with the first game scheduled to be Saturday, October 8, 2022, against the Bakersfield Condors

2024 AHL All Star Classic

On May 11, 2022, It was announced that the Tech CU Arena will host the 2024 AHL All Star classic, which will take place on Monday, February 5, 2024.

References

American Hockey League venues
Indoor ice hockey venues in California
San Jose Barracuda
Sports venues in San Jose, California